İhsan Ketin (10 April 1914 – 16 December 1995) was a Turkish earth scientist.

Early years
He was born in 1914 in the Central Anatolian town of Kayseri, located at the foothills of Mt. Aergus (the volcano Erciyes). He won a state scholarship to study natural sciences abroad, as part of Mustafa Kemal Atatürk's plans of modernizing the newly formed Republic of Turkey. He started his undergraduate studies in Natural Sciences at Berlin University in 1934, and subsequently completed his doctorate at Bonn University in 1938 under the supervision of Hans Cloos, thus becoming the first native of Turkey with a doctorate degree in geology in the Republic of Turkey. Ketin returned to Turkey in 1938, and started his career as assistant professor at the Geological Institute of Istanbul Technical University.

Scientific career
Through a faithful coincidence, the long-dormant North Anatolian fault awoke to activity, first gently with the Tercan quake of 21 November 1939, but then violently with the great Erzincan catastrophe of 28 and 29 December 1939, which claimed the lives of some 32.000 people. Ketin rushed to the field with many other geologists, Turkish and foreign, to map the surface breaks and the fearful damage. After Ketin published his paper on the North Anatolian fault, its importance was acknowledged when he was awarded the coveted Gustav-Steinmann-Medaille, the highest distinction the Geologische Vereinigung e.V. gives, in the journal, in which Ketin's paper had been published.

In 1953, Ketin accepted a new position, the chair in General Geology in the Faculty of Mines at Istanbul Technical University. In 1953, he published his well-known comparison of the San Andreas and North Anatolian faults. Ketin contributed four major papers to the International Tectonic Map of Europe, published in 1960, in which he portrays Turkey as a dominantly asymmetric orogen, accreted from north to south. His tectonic and kinematic views formed the basis for many large-scale tectonic models in Turkey.

Ketin retired from active teaching in 1983, but remained in the Department of Geology as professor emeritus until his death in 1995.

Ketin had an enormous memory capability. As Celal Sengör, one of his students, said he was a hafiz able to reciting all Koran verses in Arabic and Turkish.

Publications 
Selected publications of Ihsan Ketin
 1940, Über die Tektonik und den Vulkanismus der Gegend von Bad Bertrich (inaugural dissertation). Jahrb. Reichsstelle Bodenforsch. 60, 49–98.
 1946, Geologische Untersuchungen auf der Halbinsel Kapıdağ und Inseln im Marmara Meer, Türkei. Istanbul Univ. Fak. Mecm. B XI, 69–83.
 1948, Über die tektonisch-mechanischen Folgerungen aus den grossen anatolischen Erdbeben des letzten Dezenniums. Geol. Rundsch. 36, 77–83.
 1954 (with Roesli, F.), Makroseismische Untersuchungen über das nordwestanatolische Erdbeben vom 18 März 1953. Eclogae Geol. Helv. 46, 187–208.
 1956, On the geology of Yozgat region and tectonic features of the Central Anatolian Massif (Kırşehir Crystallines). Geol. Soc. Turkey Bull. 6, 29–40.
 1956, Über einige messbare Überschiebungen in Anatolien. Berg. Hüttenmänn. Mon.heft. 101, 22–24.
 1957, Kuzey Anadolu Deprem Fayı. Istanbul Tech. Univ. Derg. 15, 49–52.
 1959, Über Alter und Art der kristallinen Gesteine und Erzlagerstätten in Zentral Anatolien. Berg. Hüttenmännn. Mon.heft. 104, 163–169.
 1961, Über die magmatischen Erscheinungen in der Türkei. Geol. Soc. Turkey Bull. 7, 16–32.
 1966, Tectonic units of Anatolia (Asia Minor). Min. Res. Explor. Inst. Turkey (MTA) Bull. 66, 23–34.
 1969, Über die nordanatolische Horizontalverschiebung. Min. Res. Explor. Inst. Turkey (MTA) Bull. 72, 1–28.
 1976, San Andreas ve Kuzey Anadolu Fayları arasında bir karşılaştırma (A comparison between the San Andreas and the North Anatolian faults). Geol. Soc. Turkey Bull. 19, 149–154.
 1980 (with Şengör, A.M.C. and Yılmaz, Y.), Remnants of pre-late jurassic ocean in northern Turkey: fragments of Permian-Triassic Paleo Tethys. Geol. Soc. Am. Bull. 91, 599–609.
 1983, Türkiye Jeolojisine Genel Bir Bakış. Istanbul Technical University Publications, Istanbul, 595 pp.
 1984, Türkiye’nin bindirmeli ve naplı yapısında yeni gelişmeler ve bir örnek Uludağ Masifi (New developments in the overthrust-nappe tectonics of Turkey with the example of Uludağ massif). In: Ercan, T., Ça layan, M.A., Ketin Simpozyumu Feb. 20–21, Geological Society of Turkey, Ankara, pp. 19–36.
 1989 (with Güner, G.) Istanbul Bölgesinde Karbonifer yaşlı Trakya Formasyonu’nun yapısal özelliği (Structural peculiarity of the Carboniferous Thracian Formation in the Istanbul area). Mühendis. Jeol. Bul. 11, 13–18.
 1995, The geological evolution of the volcanic complex of Mt. Erciyes. In: Güler, O. (Ed.), Antik Çağ Ikonografisinde Erciyes.  stanbul Arekoloji ve Sanat Yayınları, pp. 107–115.

References 

1914 births
People from Kayseri
Humboldt University of Berlin alumni
University of Bonn alumni
Turkish geologists
Turkish non-fiction writers
Academic staff of Istanbul Technical University
Recipients of TÜBİTAK Science Award
Tectonicists
1995 deaths
20th-century geologists